Yelp, also known as the GNOME Help Browser is the default help viewer for GNOME that allows users to access help documentation. Yelp follows the freedesktop.org help system specification and reads mallard, DocBook, man pages, info, and HTML documents. HTML is available by using XSLT to render XML documents into HTML.

Yelp has a search feature as well as a toolbar at the top for navigation through previously viewed documentation. Because it functions as a type of web browser, it uses Firefox as a dependency and Firefox must be installed in order to use yelp.

Yelp can be accessed by typing  either into GNOME Shell, after pressing  within GNOME, or within a terminal using the  format. The command  can also be used to access Yelp.

Although Yelp is not required for GNOME to function, it is required to view GNOME's help documentation. Ubuntu also uses yelp to provide a customized help interface for its software.

A format string vulnerability in GNOME versions 2.19.90 and 2.24 allowed arbitrary code execution through Yelp.

References

External links
 GNOME Help

GNOME Applications
Technical communication
Software documentation
Online help